Lancaster Place is a short section of road in central London, which connects Waterloo Bridge to the major junction with the Aldwych and Strand. It is completely bisected by the northbound-only Strand Underpass which dives below the Aldwych enabling Kingsway-bound traffic (and single-decker bendy buses on the bus route 521) to skip the "fiveways" junction. Brettenham House and the more famous Somerset House front onto the West and East sides of Lancaster Place respectively.

Transport

Served by local buses, bus stops are located on both sides of the road. While the northbound stop is served by all buses that continue through Aldwych or Trafalgar Square, the southbound stop is only served by those from Trafalgar Square, i.e. 139 and 176. 

Streets in the City of Westminster